Mozart in the Jungle is a television series produced by Picrow for Amazon Studios. The pilot was written by Roman Coppola, Jason Schwartzman, and Alex Timbers and directed by Paul Weitz. The show was given a production order in March 2014. It is considered a dramedy.

On February 9, 2016, Mozart in the Jungle was renewed for a third season.  On January 30, 2017, Amazon announced that the series had been renewed for a fourth season, scheduled for release on February 16, 2018. As of February 16, 2018, 40 episodes of Mozart in the Jungle have aired, concluding its fourth season. In April 2018, Amazon announced that it had cancelled the show, and it would not air for a fifth season.

Series overview

Episodes

Season 1 (2014)

Season 2 (2015)

Season 3 (2016)

Season 4 (2018)

References 

Lists of American comedy-drama television series episodes